Annavaram a village in East Godavari district, Andhra Pradesh, India

Annavaram may also refer to:

Annavaram, Guntur district, a village in Krishna district, Andhra Pradesh, India
Annavaram (film), a Telugu film